Noah Franke (born March 25, 1995) is an American soccer player who currently plays for Greenville Triumph SC in USL League One.

Career

College
Franke spent his entire college career at Creighton University between 2014 and 2017, where he made 85 appearances, starting 57 games, scoring 6 goals and tallying 14 assists in his time with the Bluejays.  

During his time at college, Franke played with Premier Development League sides Orlando City U-23 and Tampa Bay Rowdies U23.

Professional
Franke was selected in the fourth round (80th overall) of the 2018 MLS SuperDraft by FC Dallas. However, he was not signed by the club.

On March 28, 2018, Franke signed for USL side Pittsburgh Riverhounds SC.

On April 15, 2021, Franke joined USL League One club FC Tucson ahead of the 2021 season.

Franke signed with Greenville Triumph SC on January 21, 2022.

References

1995 births
Living people
American soccer players
Association football midfielders
Creighton Bluejays men's soccer players
FC Dallas draft picks
Greenville Triumph SC players
Orlando City U-23 players
Pittsburgh Riverhounds SC players
Soccer players from Orlando, Florida
Tampa Bay Rowdies U23 players
FC Tucson players
USL Championship players
USL League Two players